Nihar Ranjan Ghosh (born 11 August 1955) is an Indian politician who currently serves as Member of Legislative Assembly from Chanchal constituency and also served as Member of Legislative Assembly from English Bazar constituency. He joined All India Trinamool Congress party in November 2017.

Early life
Ghosh was born to Suresh Ghosh who was a middle class person in Malda district. Ghosh passed 12th from Akrumoni Coronation Institution.

Political career
Ghosh is many times councillor in English Bazar Municipality as an Independent and his wife is also a councillor with his support. In 2016 West Bengal Legislative Assembly general election he won the English Bazar (Vidhan Sabha constituency) seat with support of CPIM and Congress as an Independent party candidate. In November 2016 he joined West Bengal ruling party All India Trinamool Congress (TMC) as proposed by TMC leader Mamata Banerjee.

References

Living people
West Bengal MLAs 2016–2021
1955 births
People from Malda district
West Bengal district councillors
West Bengal municipal councillors
Trinamool Congress politicians from West Bengal